Harold Davis (10 May 1933 – 26 June 2018) was a Scottish professional footballer, who was best known for his time with Rangers.

Player
Born in Fife, Davis and his family moved to Perth after his father was injured during World War II. He began his senior football career at Scot Symon's East Fife and quickly gained praise as a tough tackling, no-nonsense defender, but was drafted for national service in 1951 and shunned easier alternative postings to join the Black Watch. Whilst in the army he fought in the Korean War and was seriously injured on the battlefield; he spent two years in hospitals recuperating from bullet wounds to his abdomen and foot.

While recovering from his injuries, Davis was determined not just to live a 'normal' life but to be extremely fit and overcome any challenge, the first being the medical opinion that he would no longer be able to play professional football. His progress impressed David Kinnear, a physiotherapist at the facility who had once played for Rangers, now managed by Scot Symon, and as a result of the mutual connections Davis signed for the reigning Scottish league champions at the age of 22. He helped them retain their title in his first campaign at Ibrox.

That was the first of seven winner's medals he would claim during eight years at the Glasgow club, making 272 appearances in all competitions and also taking part in a continental final when Rangers lost out to Fiorentina in the 1961 European Cup Winners' Cup Final. He missed out on the 1960 Scottish Cup Final after being injured by a heavy challenge in the semi-final victory over Celtic.

He then spent a season with Partick Thistle before retiring.

Coaching career
Immediately after his playing days ended, Davis had a three-year spell as manager of Queen's Park in Scotland's second tier. He then returned to Rangers as a coach working with Davie White, followed a year as manager of Queen of the South and a stint coaching at Dundee (again under White, during which they won the 1973 Scottish League Cup Final) before leaving football to run a hotel in Wester Ross where he was able to continue a passion for fishing. In 1998, he survived a broken neck sustained in a road accident.

Honours
Rangers
Scottish League (4): 1956–57, 1958–59, 1960–61, 1962–63

Scottish Cup: 1961–62
Scottish League Cup (2): 1960–61, 1961–62
European Cup Winners' Cup: Runner-up 1960–61

References

1933 births
2018 deaths
Scottish military personnel
Scottish footballers
East Fife F.C. players
Rangers F.C. players
Partick Thistle F.C. players
Scottish football managers
Queen of the South F.C. managers
Queen's Park F.C. managers
Rangers F.C. non-playing staff
Black Watch soldiers
British Army personnel of the Korean War
Association football wing halves
Scottish Football League players
Scottish Football League managers
People from Cupar
Footballers from Fife
Newburgh F.C. players
Scottish Junior Football Association players
Association football coaches